The 2013 NASCAR Whelen Euro Series was the fifth season and 1st with the new series denomination of stock car racing in Europe. The season started on 31 March at Nogaro, and ended on 13 October at Le Mans after twelve races at six meetings. Ander Vilariño is the defending driver's champion.

Participants

Schedule
The schedule was announced in November 2012. Dijon and Monza will be added to the series schedule, while the round at Motorland Aragón will be a six-hour, non-points endurance race.

Results and standings

Races

See also

2013 NASCAR Sprint Cup Series
2013 NASCAR Nationwide Series
2013 NASCAR Camping World Truck Series
2013 NASCAR K&N Pro Series East
2013 NASCAR K&N Pro Series West
2013 ARCA Racing Series
2013 NASCAR Canadian Tire Series
2013 NASCAR Toyota Series

References

External links
 

NASCAR Whelen Euro Series seasons
NASCAR Whelen Euro Series